Aureolus (died 268) was a Roman military commander and would-be usurper.

Aureolus may also refer to:

People and fictional characters

People 
Aureolus of Aragon (died 809), traditionally known as chief of the Franks in the region of Aragón.
Petrus Aureolus (c. 1280–1322), scholastic philosopher and theologian, known for his activities in Bologna, Toulouse, and Paris, and his Archbishopric of Aix-en-Provence.
Paracelsus (c. 1493–1541), born Philippus Aureolus Theophrastus Bombastus von Hohenheim, Swiss physician, alchemist, lay theologian, and philosopher of the German Renaissance.

Fictional characters 
 Aureolus Izzard, descendant of the alchemist Paracelsus, character from A Certain Magical Index.

Bestiary 
Acanthoscelides aureolus, a species of leaf beetle in the family Chrysomelidae.
Golden mojarra (Deckertichthys aureolus), a species of mojarra.
Icaricia saepiolus aureolus, subspecies of Icaricia saepiolus, a butterfly of the family Lycaenidae.
Philodromus aureolus (wandering crab spider), a mainly European running crab spider of the family Philodromidae.
Tellico salamander (Plethodon aureolus), a small woodland salamander.

Botany 
Rubus aureolus, a species of flowering plant belonging to the family Rosaceae.

See also 
 Aureola
 Aureola (disambiguation)
 Aureole